Issiglio is a comune (municipality) in the Metropolitan City of Turin in the Italian region Piedmont, located about  north of Turin.

Issiglio borders the following municipalities: Castellamonte, Val di Chy, Rueglio, Vistrorio, and Vidracco.

References

Cities and towns in Piedmont